This is a list of the Hong Kong national under-23 football team results.

2010

2011

References 
 大港腳國際賽非官方全紀錄（updated 24-10-2009） (in Chinese)

under-23 football team results
National under-23 association football team results